Bardo is a 2016 short drama film directed by Scott Aharoni and Dennis Latos. Bardo signed a three-year distribution deal with ShortsTV.

Awards and nominations

Film festival awards

Film festival official selections

References

External links

 
 Official Website

2016 films
2016 short films
2016 drama films
2010s English-language films